Nambulapulakunta is a village in Sri Sathya Sai district of the Indian state of Andhra Pradesh. It is the headquarters of Nambulapulakunta mandal in Kadiri revenue division. According to the Geological Survey of India, pyrophyllite and radiating crystals of chloritoid are located in the ridges to the north of Nambulapulakunta.

References 

Villages in Sri Sathya Sai district
Geology of Andhra Pradesh
Mandal headquarters in Sri Sathya Sai district